Wellersburg is a borough in Somerset County, Pennsylvania, United States. It is part of the Johnstown, Pennsylvania, Metropolitan Statistical Area. The population was 181 at the 2010 census.

Geography

The borough is located at the extreme southern end of Southampton Township, along its border with Maryland. Pennsylvania Route 160 passes through Wellersburg as it runs between the Maryland border to the south and Southampton Township to the north.

Demographics

At the 2000 census there were 176 people in 84 households, including 51 families, in the borough.  The population density was 223.4 people per square mile (86.0/km2). There were 90 housing units at an average density of 114.2 per square mile (44.0/km2).  The racial makeup of the borough was 98.86% White, and 1.14% from two or more races.
Of the 84 households 15.5% had children under the age of 18 living with them, 45.2% were married couples living together, 10.7% had a female householder with no husband present, and 38.1% were non-families. 36.9% of households were one person and 17.9% were one person aged 65 or older. The average household size was 2.10 and the average family size was 2.63.

The age distribution was 15.9% under the age of 18, 6.8% from 18 to 24, 28.4% from 25 to 44, 27.3% from 45 to 64, and 21.6% 65 or older. The median age was 44 years. For every 100 females there were 83.3 males. For every 100 females age 18 and over, there were 87.3 males.

The median household income was $21,111 and the median family income  was $23,750. Males had a median income of $24,688 versus $18,750 for females. The per capita income for the borough was $14,495. About 4.3% of families and 5.4% of the population were below the poverty line, including none of those under the age of eighteen or sixty five or over.

References

Boroughs in Somerset County, Pennsylvania
Populated places established in 1830
1857 establishments in Pennsylvania